Witchcraft is a lost 1916 American drama silent film directed by Frank Reicher and written by Margaret Turnbull. The film stars Fannie Ward, Jack Dean, Paul Weigel and Lillian Leighton. The film was released on October 16, 1916, by Paramount Pictures.

Plot
Suzette and her mother are two Huguenots living in a New England colony whose elders persecute any so-called deviant behavior, labeling it as witchcraft. When Suzette's mother falls ill, Suzette seeks the help of Nokomis, an Indian woman who has been accused of witchcraft. Suzette meets and falls in love with Richard Wayne. But Makepeace Struble, Wayne's protégé, wants Suzette for him and sends Wayne to work for the governor, so as to give him free rein with the young woman. Accusing his mother of witchcraft, Struble blackmails the girl into marrying him. The man becomes more and more violent and when his mother dies, Nokomis gives Suzette a talisman, telling her that an Indian revolt is brewing. She warns Wayne and Struble, struck by a stroke of apoplexy, accuses her of having cast a spell on him. Although Suzette saved the city from Indian attack, she is still sentenced to hang. She will only be able to save herself through the last-minute intervention of Wayne and the governor and, eventually, she will be able to marry the man she loves.

Cast 
Fannie Ward as Suzette
Jack Dean as Richard Wayne
Paul Weigel as Makepeace Struble 
Lillian Leighton as Nokomis

References

External links 
 
 

1916 films
1910s English-language films
Silent American drama films
1916 drama films
Paramount Pictures films
American black-and-white films
Lost American films
American silent feature films
1916 lost films
Lost drama films
Films about witchcraft
Films directed by Frank Reicher
1910s American films
Silent horror films